Malware Bell is a malware program made in Taiwan somewhere between 2006 and 2007.

Installation
Malware Bell tries to install automatically upon visiting a website promoting or containing the malware.

Symptoms
 Some files are translated to Chinese language.
 Time and date reset to the lowest number (e.g. January 1, 1901, 12.00 am) and changes time-to-time.
 Creates "Taiwan" folders and Chinese-language files automatically anywhere on the computer and consumes a large amount of memory, and usually open up at any time.
 Several results on Google is changed to pornography advertising.

Malware